The Larch was a family of rocket engine intended as an upgrade to Black Arrow launch vehicles. They were manufactured by Rolls-Royce between 1965–1971. They burned kerosene fuel and hydrogen peroxide.

References

High-test peroxide
Rocket engines using kerosene propellant
Larch
Rocket engines using hypergolic propellant